Gérard Cherpion (born 15 March 1948 in Dombasle-sur-Meurthe, Meurthe-et-Moselle) is a member of the National Assembly of France. He represents Vosges's 2nd constituency,  and is a member of the Republicans.

On 24 February 2022, he announced he would stand down at the 2022 French legislative election.

References

1948 births
Living people
People from Meurthe-et-Moselle
Rally for the Republic politicians
Union for a Popular Movement politicians
The Republicans (France) politicians
The Social Right
Deputies of the 12th National Assembly of the French Fifth Republic
Deputies of the 13th National Assembly of the French Fifth Republic
Deputies of the 14th National Assembly of the French Fifth Republic
Deputies of the 15th National Assembly of the French Fifth Republic
Regional councillors of Grand Est